Julien Balkany (born 29 January 1981, in Neuilly-sur-Seine, France) is a French businessman and an investor based in London. He is the younger half-brother of former French Member of Parliament and former Mayor of Levallois, Patrick Balkany. He is the Chairman of Panoro Energy ASA, the Norwegian oil & gas company based in London as well as the cofounder of the private investment company Nanes Balkany Partners based in New York. He also ran for office in the June 2012 French Parliament election but was defeated.

Studies and personal life

He is of Hungarian origin, and his father Gyula Balkany was deported to Auschwitz before immigrating to France and founding Rety, a Paris-based fashion house.

He was raised in Neuilly, France and attended schools at Sainte-Croix de Neuilly and then at Prepasup-Ipesup Paris, where he obtained his baccalaureate cum laude. He studied at the Institute of Political Studies in Strasbourg and then Finance at UC Berkeley. He started his career in the emerging markets group of Bear Stearns  in New York and lived in mid-town Manhattan.

Business career
In 2008, Julien Balkany co-founded Nanes Balkany Partners with Daryl Nanes. The firm is a New York-based activist hedge fund which primarily pursues active value investments in publicly traded oil and gas companies. He had substantial interests in Vaalco Energy and Toreador Resources Corp. His strategy of attempting to take advantage of undervalued companies has contributed to his reputation of being a raider and an activist shareholder. In November 2010, Balkany disposed of his shares in Nanes Balkany Partners I LP, but remained a partner at Nanes Balkany Partners LLC and co-launched Nanes Balkany Partners II LP in 2012 after being defeated in the French legislative election. In May 2013, Balkany built a large stake in Petrogrand  and has been actively seeking to influence the Swedish oil company, to force it to exit Russia  and publicly supported Shelton Petroleum hostile takeover attempt.

In 2014 his fund built a stake  then became the largest shareholder of Gasfrac Energy Services Inc., a Canadian publicly listed oil and gas services company, which has developed and commercialized a unique environmentally friendly waterless fracking technology using propane gel (LPG) instead of water and chemical products. In May 2014 he obtained a full change of the board of directors of Gasfrac, including the resignation of the 7 incumbent members of the Board, and the nomination of 6 new directors, including himself.  After filing for CCAA protection in January 2015 Gasfrac sold most of its assets to Step Energy Services Ltd, a private coiled tubing company owned by private equity firm ARC Financial Corp. He served as a non-executive director of Gasfrac until the company was acquired by Calfrac Well Services Ltd under a plan of arrangement on July 8, 2015.

In October 2014 he was elected chairman of the board of Panoro Energy, a Norwegian oil and gas exploration and production companies with assets in Tunisia, Nigeria and Gabon listed on the Oslo Stock Exchange. Nanes Balkany Partners has been one of the new core shareholders of Panoro that proactively obtained the election of a renewed board of directors.

He served as non-executive vice-chairman and director of Toreador, an oil and gas exploration and production company with operations in France and listed on the NASDAQ, from January 2009 to March 2011. He initiated changes in management and in the board of directors of Toreador in January 2009, in order to rebuild value for the shareholders. 
After the firm was highly criticized for its alleged role in the controversy on shale gas exploration in France and the subsequent ban of use of hydraulic fracking technologies, he resigned from the Board in March 2011, with immediate effect. He continued acting in the capacity of a special advisor to Toreador's President until August 2011 when he severed all his links with the company.
Toreador completed a merger with Zaza Energy Corporation in February 2012 and later that year disposed of all its assets and businesses in France.

He has been a non-executive director of the board of the Norwegian Energy Company ASA ("Noreco"), a Norwegian oil and gas exploration and production company publicly listed in Oslo and with operations and assets in Norway, the UK and Denmark, from March 2015 to May 2016, until the sale of all its oil and gas assets. In March 2015, Noreco concluded an out-of-court financial restructuring including a debt to equity swap and the election of a new board of directors.

Julien also seats on the board of Amromco the third largest Romanian gas producer, Pan-African Diamonds and Sarmin Bauxite Limited.

Concomitantly,  Balkany has been a managing director at Nanes Delorme Capital Management LLC, a New York-based financial advisory and broker-dealer firm, since 2005. He has also been a member of the advisory board of Stellar Energy, a London-based investment bank dedicated to the oil and gas industry.

Recognition
Balkany was ranked #1 on the 2008 annual list of the "30 Under 30" world's top traders and hedge fund managers published by the U.S. magazine Trader Monthly.

In June 2010 he also received an award as one of Institutional Investor Magazine’s Hedge Fund Rising Stars at the 8th Annual Hedge Fund Industry Awards.

On 11 February 2013 Balkany was hosted on CNBC Squawk Box by Andrew Ross Sorkin  and discussed his views on energy activism and oil and gas M&A.

In August 2018, Julien Balkany was ranked #97 in the list of the Top 100 most influential French entrepreneurs.

Political career
On 11 November 2011, he announced that he would stand as candidate for the June 2012 French legislative elections in the First constituency for French residents overseas, including the United States and Canada. He finished fourth, receiving 6.6% of the vote. 
In spring 2013 he decided not run for the French legislative election, 2013 in the First constituency for French residents overseas
.
According to Le Figaro  He withdrew from the race after having negotiated to be candidate for the UMP at the European Parliament election due in May 2014.

Controversies

French-language private school controversy 
Whilst campaigning in Montreal, Balkany declared he wanted overseas French high schools known as 'Lycée Français' to limit the enrolment of the children of American celebrities so that French nationals could gain access to these exclusive institutions. However, these private schools in North America are not under the direct authority of the French government, despite having accreditation with the Agency for French Teaching Abroad.

References

External links
 Nanes Balkany Partners LLC
Toreador Resources Corp
Stellar Energy Advisors
Personal Political Blog
Gasfrac Energy Services

1981 births
Living people
French businesspeople